This article chronicles the seasons of Derby County Football Club from their formation in 1884 to the present day.

Details of Derby County's final league position is given (from the 1888–99 season, when The Football League was founded), along with which round they made it to in both the FA Cup, the EFL Cup (which began in the 1960–61 season) and any European competitions that Derby had qualified for.

Seasons

Overall
Seasons spent at Level 1 of the football league system: 65
Seasons spent at Level 2 of the football league system: 54 
Seasons spent at Level 3 of the football league system: 4
Seasons spent at Level 4 of the football league system: 0

Key

Key to league record:
Pld = Matches played
W = Matches won
D = Matches drawn
L = Matches lost
GF = Goals for
GA = Goals against
Pts = Points
Pos = Final position

Key to divisions:
FL = Football League
Div 1 = Football League First Division
Div 2 = Football League Second Division
Div 3 (N) = Football League Third Division (North)
Div 3 = Football League Third Division
Prem = Premier League
Champ = EFL Championship

Key to rounds:
Ban = Banned
DNQ = Did not qualify for main competition
GS = Group stage
PR = Preliminary round
R1 = Round 1
R2 = Round 2

R3 = Round 3
R4 = Round 4
R5 = Round 5
QF = Quarter-finals
SF = Semi-finals
R/U = Runners-up
W = Winners

Notes

References

Seasons
 
Derby County F.C.